Mỹ Lý station is a railway station on North–South railway at Km 292 in Vietnam. It's located in Diễn Châu, Nghệ An between Chợ Sy station and Quán Hành station.

References 

Railway stations in Vietnam